Stephen Reuben Tonkin, known as Stevie Tonks, (born 1992) is a New Zealand singer from Christchurch, who came 4th on the second season of The X Factor (New Zealand). In the boys category he was mentored by Natalie Bassingthwaighte, and before that by Natalia Kills.

Early life
Tonks was born in Christchurch, New Zealand in 1992. Prior to auditioning for The X Factor, he was a performing arts student at the Southern Institute of Technology.

Musical influence
Tonks cites Sia, Jeff Buckley and Michael Jackson as his main musical influences.

The X Factor

Tonks attended the pre-auditions for the second series of New Zealand reality show The X Factor in Christchurch in November 2014 and advanced through to the judges' auditions. Tonks performed the U2 song "I Still Haven't Found What I'm Looking For" at his audition and received positive feedback from all four judges who advanced him through to bootcamp. He sang "Jealous" for the "Six Chair Challenge" at bootcamp and progressed through to judges retreats with mentor Natalia Kills and then by Natalie Bassingthwaighte after Kills was fired from the show. He then sang his version of "Recovery" at judges retreats causing then mentor Natalia Kills to cry. He soon advanced to the live shows as one of the Top 13. His week one cover of "Young and Beautiful" reached No.5 in the New Zealand artists' singles chart, and his week four cover of "Crazy" also reached No. 5 in the same chart. Tonks found himself in the bottom two in Week 7 after his performance of "Billie Jean" failed to impress. He sang "Grenade" in the final showdown against Lili Bayliss and was saved by the judges with only Stan Walker voting to send him home. Tonks found himself in the bottom two again in week 8 against Steve Broad. He was again saved by the judges with only Melanie Blatt voting to send him home. Tonks was eliminated in the final showdown with Brendon Thomas and the Vibes, and only mentor Natalie Bassingthwaighte voting to keep him.

Discography

Digital releases from The X Factor

References 

The X Factor (New Zealand TV series) contestants
1992 births
Living people
21st-century New Zealand male singers